The Pleasure Girls is a 1965 British drama film directed by Gerry O'Hara and starring Francesca Annis, Ian McShane and Klaus Kinski.

Plot
When a beautiful young woman, Sally (Francesca Annis), moves to London to pursue a modelling career, she moves in with Angela (Anneke Wills) and Dee (Suzanna Leigh) and discovers the world of the carefree bachelor girl in Swinging London of the 1960s. Over one weekend - filled with parties, blossoming friendships, and romantic encounters with Keith (Ian McShane) and Nikko (Klaus Kinski) - the vivacious girls learn about life's pleasures and pains.

Cast
 Francesca Annis as Sally
 Ian McShane as Keith Dexter
 Klaus Kinski as Nikko Stalmar
 Tony Tanner as Paddy
 Mark Eden as Prinny
 Suzanna Leigh as Dee
 Anneke Wills as Angela
 Rosemary Nicols as Marion
 Carol Cleveland as Ella
 Peter Diamond as Rat-Face
 Tony Doonan as Reilly
 Colleen Fitzpatrick as Cobber
 Hugh Futcher as Pablo
 Hal Hamilton as Peter 'E'-Type
 Jonathan Hansen as Ivor
 Yvonne Antrobus as Waitress
 David Graham as 1st Gambler
 Julian Holloway as Hanger-on
 Brian Cant as Man in pub (uncredited)

DVD and Blu-ray release
The film was published in dual format edition (containing both DVD & Blu-ray on the one disc) by the BFI. It was released as part of the "Flipside" strand. It was produced in an alternative export cut (Blu-ray only) and export version scenes (DVD only).

References

External links

1965 films
1965 drama films
British drama films
British black-and-white films
Films directed by Gerry O'Hara
Films scored by Malcolm Lockyer
1960s English-language films
1960s British films